is a former professional Japanese baseball player. He played as a pitcher in Nippon Professional Baseball (NPB) for the Yomiuri Giants (2002–2008), the Hokkaido Nippon-Ham Fighters (2009–2011) and the Yokohama DeNA BayStars (2012–2017).

External links

1983 births
Living people
People from Funabashi
Japanese baseball players
Nippon Professional Baseball pitchers
Yomiuri Giants players
Hokkaido Nippon-Ham Fighters players
Yokohama DeNA BayStars players
Baseball people from Chiba Prefecture